"Downtown" is a song by Neil Young. It was released in 1995 as the lead single from his twenty-third studio album, Mirror Ball. The song was recorded with the members of American rock band Pearl Jam. The song was nominated for Best Rock Song at the 1996 Grammy Awards.

Track listing
 "Downtown" (Radio Edit) - 4:10
 "Downtown" (Album Version) - 5:11
 "Big Green Country" - 5:06

Charts

Weekly charts

Year-end charts

References

1995 singles
Neil Young songs
Songs written by Neil Young
Song recordings produced by Brendan O'Brien (record producer)
1995 songs